Bensbach Airport is an airfield serving Bensbach, in the Western Province of Papua New Guinea. It was built to service the nearby Bensbach Wildlife Lodge and opened in February 1977.

References

External links
 

Airports in Papua New Guinea
Western Province (Papua New Guinea)